Salvia jordanii is a species of Salvia from Spain, Morocco, Algeria, and Libya. It was formerly in a much smaller genus Rosmarinus, but was moved into Salvia based on DNA evidence.

References

External links
 
 

Flora of Morocco
Flora of Spain
Flora of Algeria
Flora of Libya
jordanii
Plants described in 1866